, also spelled Asami Joh, is a Japanese actress and former AV Idol from Tokyo. Fans of tokusatsu TV shows also know her as the villain Shibolena in the Super Sentai series Denji Sentai Megaranger.

Life and career

Adult video actress
Jō was born in Tokyo on September 15, 1975, and was a TV commercial model before starting a career in the adult entertainment industry. She was appearing on the late-night TV show Gilgamesh Night when she made her debut in adult videos (AV) at age twenty for the Alice Japan studio with A Bare Skin Jennu in October 1995.

While many Japanese AVs involve some form of documentary style, Asami Jō's videos are mainly in the fictional style of the pink film and early AV. Her February 1996 release for Alice Japan, Love Potion, told the story of a woman who supports her boyfriend financially while he is studying to become a lawyer. She employs sex as a means to make cosmetic sales. Thrilling Club: A Scandalous Night With You (April 1996), had Jō as a married woman who meets an old classmate, with whom she and her husband engage in a menage-a-trois.

In The Beautiful Slave (May 1996), she played the role of a young woman who is unhappy with the marriage her parents have arranged for her. Obscene Model (June 1996) had Jō in the role of a woman who acts like a cat in heat and when she is taken to a veterinarian engages in wild sex with him. 
In Top Secret Is Full Nude, released in July 1996, she played a woman who is raped by a man who is later hired by her husband, for whose company she also works. Almost Broken was an organized crime melodrama with Jō escaping from a gang and becoming involved in telephone sex. Like the previously-described videos, this August 1996 release was an Alice Japan production.

Mainstream actress
Jō was a regular cast member on the erotic-themed nighttime TV show Gilgamesh Night from 1995 to 1998. In April 1996 she played the character "Kaoru" in the theatrical film , part of a long running series of "Female Ninja" (Kunoichi) movies. Beginning in February 1996, she also starred in a number of direct-to-video V-cinema productions including La Blue Girl Live 2: Live Birth of the Demon Child and La Blue Girl Live 3: Lady Ninja.

Also in 1996, she starred in the fantasy comedy TV series HEN Vol. 2 broadcast by TV Asahi from May to June 1996. Later in 1996, she starred in another TV show, Shiyou yo 2: Onna kyōshi Nazuna no baai, a comedy broadcast on TV Asahi from November to December 1996.

Jō landed a more extensive TV role in Denji Sentai Megaranger playing the character of Shibolena, an android from the Evil Electric Kingdom Nezirejia who was modeled after the long dead daughter of the leader of Nejirejia invasion party. She also appeared in the series as her younger android sibling Hizumina. This TV Asahi series ran in 51 installments from February 1997 to February 1998. She reprised the character of Shibolena for the V-cinema production  originally released in March 1998.

Appearances

Adult Videos

Image video 
 Gilgame Angel: Asami Jo (1995)

V-Cinema 
 La Blue Girl Live 2: Live Birth of the Demon Child (February 24, 1996)
 La Blue Girl Live 3: Lady Ninja (February 24, 1996)
 Lady Ninja: Reflections of Darkness (April 13, 1996)
 Nippon Bicycle Race Academy - It's Youth! (May 3, 1997)
 Denji Sentai Megaranger vs Carranger (March 13, 1998)
 Tokyo Night Wars (May 1, 1998)
 Underage Sex Offender Report (July 1, 1998)
 Seiju Sentai Gingaman vs Megaranger (March 12, 1999)

Movies 
  (April 1996)
 Break Heat バクの胃袋を開け! (February 14, 1998) as Ginko Ishida

TV Shows 
 Gilgamesh Night (April, 1995 - March 28, 1998)
 HEN (1996)
  (1996)
  (1997)
 Denji Sentai Megaranger (1997–1998)

Pictorial Books 
 "Asami Jo Pictorial" (Scholar, September 1995) 
 "Hinano" (Eichi Press, June 1996) 
 "Sora" (Eichi Press, March 1997)

References

External links
 
 
 

1975 births
Japanese female adult models
Japanese pornographic film actresses
Living people
Actresses from Tokyo